The 2023 Arizona Wildcats football team will represent the University of Arizona as a member of the Pacific-12 Conference during the 2023 NCAA Division I FBS football season. The Wildcats are expected to be led by Jedd Fisch in his third year as their head coach.

The Arizona football team plays its home games at Arizona Stadium in Tucson, Arizona. It was the Wildcats' 124th season of college football and their 45th in the Pacific-12 Conference.

Previous season

The Wildcats finished 5–7 overall (3–6 in conference play) and failed to qualify for a bowl game.

Offseason

Team departures
Over the course of the off-season, Arizona lost 36 total players. 5 players graduated, 3 declared for the 2023 NFL Draft, while the other 28 entered the transfer portal.

Transfer portal

Outgoing transfers
28 Arizona players elected to enter the NCAA Transfer Portal during or after the 2022 season.

† Note: Players with a dash in the new school column didn’t land on a new team for the 2023 season.

Incoming transfers
Over the off-season, Arizona added nine players via transfer portal. According to 247 Sports, Arizona had the No. 36 ranked transfer class in the country.

Returning starters

Offense

Defense

Special teams

† Indicates player was a starter in 2022 but missed all of 2023 due to injury.

Recruiting class

Arizona signed 26 players in the class of 2023. The Wildcats' was ranked forty-fourth by 247Sports and ranked forty-fifth by Rivals.com rankings. One signees were ranked in the ESPN 300 top prospect list. Arizona also signed walk-ons during national signing period.

 
 

 
 

 

 
 

 

  

*= 247Sports Composite rating; ratings are out of 1.00. (five stars= 1.00–.98, four stars= .97–.90, three stars= .80–.89, two stars= .79–.70, no stars= <70)
†= Despite being rated as a four and five star recruit by ESPN, On3.com, Rivals.com and 247Sports.com, Dorman received a four star 247Sports Composite rating.
Δ= Left the Arizona program following signing but prior to the 2023 season.

2023 overall class rankings

2024 recruiting class

 
 
 
 

2024 Overall class rankings

Walk-ons

NFL draft
 
TBD Wildcats players have declared for the 2023 NFL Draft thus far.

Preseason

Spring game
The 2023 Wildcats spring game is tentatively scheduled to take place in Tucson, Arizona on April 15, 2023. The Wildcats were scheduled to hold spring practices on March 13–14, 2023.

Award watch lists 
Listed in the order that they were released

Pac-12 Media Day
The Pac-12 Media Day was held in July 21st, 2023 at the TBD in Las Vegas, NV (Pac-12 Network). The preseason polls will be released in July 2023.

Preseason All-Pac-12 and All-American honors
First Team

Second Team

All-Pac-12 Honorable Mention

Source:

Schedule
The 2023 Wildcats' schedule consists of seven home games and five away games for the regular season. Arizona will host three Pac-12 conference opponents including Oregon State, UCLA and Utah,  will travel to five Pac-12 opponents including Colorado, Stanford, USC, Washington State and in-state-rival Arizona State (Duel in the Desert) for the 97th Territorial Cup to close out the Pac-12 regular season on the road. Arizona is not scheduled to play any Pac-12 opponents including California and Oregon in the 2023 regular season. The Wildcats' bye week comes during TBD (on TBD).

Arizona's out of conference opponents represent the SEC, Conference USA, and Big Sky conferences. The Wildcats will host two non–conference games which are against UTEP from the C-USA, Northern Arizona from the Big Sky (FCS) and will travel against Mississippi State from the SEC.

Personnel

Roster

Coaching staff

Support staff
Tedy Bruschi – Senior Advisor to Head Coach 
 Austin Herink – Assistant Director of Internal Operations Analyst for the Head Coach
Matthew Hayes – Senior Associate Athletic Director of Internal Operations, Chief Financial Officer
Lauren Vossler – Director of Travel and Football Logistics
Syndric Steptoe – Director of Player & Community Relations
Matt Doherty – Director of Player Personnel
Josh Omura – Coordinator of High School Recruiting
Brandon Sanders – Coordinator of Football Alumni and High School Relations
Kendel Bennett – Coordinator of On-Campus Recruiting
Cameron Lemons – Coordinator of Recruiting Strategy
Steven Gonzales – Creative Media Manager
Brisa Tzintzun – Social Media Coordinator
Blair Vaughan – Associate Head Strength Coach
Aaron Brosz – Assistant Strength Coach 
Ben Hilgart – Assistant Strength Coach
Trei Mitchell – Assistant Strength Coach
John Shaw – Assistant Strength Coach
Barry Boyd – Assistant Athletic Director, Football Equipment Operations 
Kevin Kikugawa – Head Athletic Trainer
Susana Melendez – Head Nutritionist
Andrew Sims – Director of Football Operations
Tim Cummins – Director of Football Video Operations 
Brian Riden – Assistant Coordinator of Football Video 
Emily Johnson – Associate Athletic Director, Athletic Training
Jenny Wyly – Associate Athletic Trainer, Physical Therapist
Paul Smith – Assistant Director, Assistant Head Athletic Trainer
Bryan Franciosi – Rehab Coordinator 
Jeff Bowe – Associate Director
Brett Gleason – Assistant Director of Communication Services
Tom Boesel – Assistant Football Manager, Equipment Operations

Analysts
Andrew Philipsen - Football Media Analyst
TBD – Senior Defensive Analyst
Michael Switzker – Senior Offensive Analyst
Darren Andrews – Offensive Analyst
Darell Garretson – Offensive Analyst
Luke McNitt – Offensive Analyst
Brett Arce – Defensive Analyst
Duane Akina – Defensive Analyst
Cason Bicknell – Special Teams Analyst
Tyler Luskin – Senior Recruiting Analyst

Graduate assistants
Teddy Bolin – Graduate Assistant
Dominic Caldwell – Graduate Assistant
Ty Nichols – Graduate Assistant
Aaron Van Horn – Graduate Assistant
Gunner Cruz – Graduate Assistant

Depth Chart

True Freshman

Injury report

Game summaries

Northern Arizona

Sources:

at Mississippi State

Sources:

UTEP

Sources:

at Stanford

Sources:

Washington

Sources:

at USC

Sources:

at Washington State

Sources:

Oregon State

Sources:

UCLA

Sources:

at Colorado

Sources:

Utah

Sources:

at Arizona State

Sources:

Rankings

Statistics

Team

Individual leaders

Defense

Key: POS: Position, SOLO: Solo Tackles, AST: Assisted Tackles, TOT: Total Tackles, TFL: Tackles-for-loss, SACK: Quarterback Sacks, INT: Interceptions, BU: Passes Broken Up, PD: Passes Defended, QBH: Quarterback Hits, FR: Fumbles Recovered, FF: Forced Fumbles, BLK: Kicks or Punts Blocked, SAF: Safeties, TD : Touchdown

Special teams

Scoring
Arizona vs Non-Conference Opponents

Arizona vs Pac-12 Opponents

Arizona vs Total Opponents

Awards and honors

Sources:

Postseason

Media coverage

Radio
ESPN Tucson - 1490 AM & 104.09 FM (ESPN Radio) and Nationwide - Dish Network, Sirius XM, Varsity Network and iHeartRadio)
KCUB 1290 AM – Football Radio Show – (Tucson, AZ)
KHYT – 107.5 FM (Tucson, AZ)
KTKT 990 AM – La Hora de Los Gatos (Spanish) – (Tucson, AZ)
KGME 910 AM – (IMG Sports Network) – (Phoenix, AZ)
KTAN 1420 AM – (Sierra Vista, AZ)
KDAP 96.5 FM (Douglas, Arizona)
KWRQ 102.3 FM – (Safford, AZ/Thatcher, AZ)
KIKO 1340 AM – (Globe, AZ)
KVWM 970 AM – (Show Low, AZ/Pinetop-Lakeside, AZ)
XENY-AM 760 AM – (Nogales, Sonora) (Spanish)
KTZR (1450 AM) - (FoxSports 1450) - (Tucson, AZ)

TV 
CBS Family – KOLD (CBS), CBSN 
ABC/ESPN Family – KGUN (ABC), ABC, ESPN, ESPN2, ESPNU, ESPN+, 
FOX Family – KMSB (FOX), FOX/FS1, FSN 
Pac-12 Network (Pac-12 Arizona)
NBC – KVOA, NBC Sports, NBCSN
PBS - KUAT
Univision - KUVE (Spanish) 
Telemundo - KHRR (Spanish)

TV ratings

All totals via Sports Media Watch. Streaming numbers not included. † - Data not available.

See also
2023–24 Arizona Wildcats men's basketball team
2023–24 Arizona Wildcats women's basketball team

References

Arizona
Arizona Wildcats football seasons
Arizona Football